Thumper is a fictional rabbit character from Disney's animated film Bambi (1942).  He is known and named for his habit of thumping his left hind foot.  The young adult version of Thumper also appears at the Walt Disney Parks and Resorts as a meetable character in Fantasyland and at Disney’s Animal Kingdom.

The character was an important influence upon the development of the movie Bambi which started production with an adult tone which seemed too serious and uncommercial.  As voiced by the young actor, four-year-old Peter Behn, the vivacious character of Thumper was expanded from its original minor role and led to a focus upon the young animals in the story.

Thumper is Disney's adaptation of Friend Hare from Felix Salten's 1923 novel Bambi, a Life in the Woods. The personality and visual appearance of the character was based upon Beatrix Potter's Benjamin Bunny. Unlike real rabbits, Thumper is drawn with paw pads, a feature that most rabbits lack.

Disney Consumer Products started a spin-off franchise, Disney Bunnies, with Thumper as the main character.

Disney film appearances

Bambi
The character Thumper first appears in the film Bambi, watching as Bambi is first presented as the young prince to the creatures of the forest.  He remarks that Bambi is "kinda wobbly" but is reproved by his mother, who makes him repeat what his father had impressed upon him that morning, "If you can't say something nice, don't say nothing at all".  This moral is now known by such names as the "Thumperian principle", "Thumper's rule" or "Thumper's law".

A few days later a still-wobbly Bambi was out with his mother when they re-encountered Thumper, who took it upon himself to teach the fawn various tricks, notably that of speech.  He succeeded in teaching Bambi a few words, notably "bird" and "flower" which Bambi accidentally used to name a young skunk.  Thumper tried to correct Bambi but the skunk said, "That's alright.  He can call me Flower if he wants to. I don't mind".  The three animals go on to become friends and this encounter provides another moral lesson in the virtues of tolerance and an easy disposition.

In the winter, Thumper tries to teach Bambi how to skate on the ice but Bambi is wobbly again.

Bambi II
In Bambi II, Thumper again appears hiding from his sisters and trying to help Bambi learn to be brave in the hopes of impressing his dad. Thumper is the main protagonist in a video storybook, Thumper Goes Exploring, which was released with the Platinum Edition  of Bambi on March 1, 2005.

Other films
The young adult version of Thumper can be seen amongst the crowd of toons during the final scene of the 1988 film Who Framed Roger Rabbit.

In the end of the movie The Lion King 1½, after Timon and Pumbaa complete watching the movie in a cinema, Timon's mom wants to watch it over again, and many characters from the film and from other Disney films join it, including Thumper, along with Bambi and Flower.

Metaphorical usage
Thumper is used as a metaphor for a cuddly pet when referring to women. "'Bambi" and "Thumper" are the names of two female bodyguards in the 1971 James Bond film Diamonds Are Forever.

The name "Thumper" is given to a snake that Andy Pipkin gets Lou to buy instead of a rabbit in Little Britain.

The name "Thumper" was used on the American B-29 Superfortress with the same rabbit shown in the film thumping on the bomb, creating the way Thumper's foot is hitting the ground like in the film. The thumping on the ground like Thumper does is the same way bombers used in World War II, pounding the ground with payloads of bombs.

References

Rabbits and hares in literature
Anthropomorphic rabbits and hares
Talking animals in fiction
Bambi characters
Film sidekicks
Male characters in animation
Child characters in animated films
Film characters introduced in 1942
Walt Disney Animation Studios characters